The Maserati Tipo 26M was a model of Grand Prix race car produced by Italian manufacturer Maserati in Bologna, for a total of 13 units, between 1930 and 1932.

Before the Tipo 26M, the original Tipo 26 from 1926 had evolved into version such as 26B, 26C and 26R.  Based on these, the Tipo 26M was designed in 1930 as mostly single-seaters (M meaning monoposto) and also referred to as 8C 2500 (8 cylinder, 2500 cc).  Six of the 26M were made into
Tipo 26M Sport for long endurance purposes.
Special two-seaters for road use, were the  26M Grand Sport by Carrozzeria Castagna, and the Sport Tipo 1000 Miglia by Ugo Zagato. Two four-seaters were later referred to as the company's first attempt at non-racing cars.

The Tipo 26M dominated the 1930 Grand Prix season having its debut at
VI Premio Reale di Roma (Luigi Arcangeli won, 25 May 1930),
IV Coppa Ciano (Luigi Fagioli won, 21 July 1930),
VI Coppa Acerbo (Achille Varzi won, Ernesto Maserati second, 17 August 1930),
III Gran Premio di Monza (Varzi won, Arcangeli second, 7 September 1930)
and VII Gran Premio de España (Varzi won, Aymo Maggi second, 5 October 1930).
In the first half of the 1931 Grand Prix season it lost to  Alfa Romeo 8C and Bugatti T51.

A higher bore engine with  carburetors from Edoardo Weber of Bologna, became the 8C 2800 that won at the IV Gran Premio di Monza (Luigi Fagioli, 6 September 1931) and I Mountains Championship at Brooklands (Tim Birkin, 17 October 1931).
Other drivers of 26M this year were Clemente Biondetti, Luigi Parenti, George Eyston, Pietro Ghersi, Umberto Klinger and René Dreyfus.

Later victories were with Tim Birkin's 26M, III Mountains Championship (Whitney Straight, 21 October 1933) and as an 8C at Circuit d'Albi GP (Buddy Featherstonhaugh, 22 July 1934).

References

Tipo 26M
Grand Prix cars